John Kocinski (born March 20, 1968 in Little Rock, Arkansas) is a retired American Grand Prix motorcycle road racer whose successes include winning the 1990 250cc World Championship, and the 1997 Superbike World Championship title.

Career

Early years
At age seventeen, Kocinski was already a factory rider for Yamaha, in the AMA Championship Cup. He won the AMA 250 Grand Prix Championship every year from 1987 to 1989, and won the 1989 Supersport race at Daytona having started 53rd in a field of 80 riders.  In 1988, he won the pole position at the 250cc US Grand Prix and finished the race in fourth place. He would also place fifth at 1988 250cc Japanese Grand Prix.

Middle years

1989 was also the year of his 500cc World Championship debut. In 1990 he raced in four different championships, but the highlight was winning the 250cc World Championship in his first full season on a Team Roberts Yamaha YZR250. 
In a funny and unusual story happening after his loss at the 1991 American Grand Prix at Laguna Seca, According to Michael Scott, Kocinski was so upset after the loss that he drove away from the track recklessly and refused to pull over when stopped by a policeman; he was arrested and sentenced to community service. He was a full-time 500cc racer for the next two years, finishing fourth and third in the championship and winning the final round in both seasons.

During his first year in the 500cc class, Kocinski infamously told reporters that if a rider hadn't won the World Championship within 2 years of starting in the class, then they should give up racing. This statement would come back to haunt the American as he competed in the top class for over six seasons without ever becoming World Champion, with many reminding him of his comment in later years.

Kocinski started 1993 in 250s, taking Suzuki's first-ever podium at this level, but switched back to 500cc mid-season after falling out with the Suzuki team. He won Cagiva's first ever dry-weather 500cc win at Laguna Seca, and came 11th overall with only four appearances. He opened 1994 with a win in Australia and finished the season in third place. After Cagiva pulled out of Grand Prix racing, Kocinski concentrated on becoming a professional water skier.

Later years
Kocinski came back to world-level motorcycle racing in 1996 when he joined the World Superbike series on a factory Ducati and came close to winning the title in his first attempt, despite falling out with Ducati during the year.  He joined the factory Castrol Honda squad for 1997, and won the title with nine wins and seven podium finishes. In the final round of the season at Sentul in Indonesia, Kocinski led teammate Aaron Slight going into the last lap of the first race. Slight needed to win the race to wrap up second in the championship and give Castrol Honda a 1-2 finish, and despite the Kiwi rider passing Kocinski early in the lap, the American re-passed Slight in a move that almost took out Slight's front wheel to take the win, meaning Slight only finished third in the championship. Kocinski's actions caused him to fall out with both the team and Slight.

He returned to the 500cc world championship in 1998 with Sito Pons' Movistar Honda team, and the following year in 1999 riding for Erv Kanemoto's sponsorless team but failed to win a race. He raced at home in AMA National championship in 2000 for Vance & Hines Ducati, and tested for Yamaha for the next two years before retiring.  He is currently a property developer in Beverly Hills, California.

In January 2008, he was reported to have been looking for a professional motorcycle racing ride for 2008 in the AMA, SBK and 250cc sections.

Grand Prix career statistics

Points system from 1988 to 1992:

Points system from 1993 onwards:

(key) (Races in bold indicate pole position; races in italics indicate fastest lap)

World Superbike Championship

References

American motorcycle racers
250cc World Championship riders
500cc World Championship riders
Superbike World Championship riders
AMA Superbike Championship riders
Sportspeople from Little Rock, Arkansas
1968 births
Living people
250cc World Riders' Champions